"Summer Son" is a song by Scottish band Texas, released as the second single from their fifth studio album, The Hush (1999). The song was released in Europe on 9 August 1999 and in the United Kingdom on 16 August 1999, peaking at number five on the UK Singles Chart. In mainland Europe, "Summer Son" became one of the band's biggest hits, reaching the top five in Austria, Finland, France, Germany, Greece, Hungary, Switzerland, and Wallonia. It has received gold certifications in Belgium and Germany.

Critical reception
J.D. Considine from The Baltimore Sun noted that the band are infusing the song with "an ABBA-esque melancholy." Howard Cohen from The Miami Herald said they do "some Garbage/ABBA melding", picking it as "this CD's catchiest number." Stephen Dalton from NME wrote that "these 12 tracks perform their ear-soothing job with ruthless efficiency", noting the "Abba-tinged retro-disco" of "Summer Son". A reviewer from Sunday Mercury stated that "the new single from Texas, is a great wedge of Scot pop. With its tubular bells chorus, catchy riff and Sharleen's breathy vocals, it's one of the best singles for weeks and deserves to go straight into the top 10." Sunday Tribune complimented its title as "really clever, right, because it's called 'Summer Son', and she's talking about a bloke, but it sounds a bit like 'Summer Sun'". Australian newspaper Sydney Morning Herald deemed it "hugely infectious".

Music video
A music video was made to accompany the song. It features Spiteri writhing with a hunky male model on a bed. The video was banned from daytime TV, as it was found too provocative.

Track listings

 UK CD1 
 "Summer Son" (enhanced version)
 "Don't You Want Me" (live at Glastonbury 99)
 "Summer Son" (Giorgio Moroder radio mix)

 UK CD2 
 "Summer Son"
 "Summer Son" (Giorgio Moroder alternative 12-inch)
 "Summer Son" (Tee's Freeze mix) - 7:30

 UK 12-inch single 
A1. "Summer Son" (Sunburn mix) – 7:39
A2. "Summer Son" (Love to Infinity radio mix) – 3:57
B1. "Summer Son" (Giorgio Moroder alternative 12-inch) – 5:14
B2. "Summer Son" (Giorgio Moroder radio mix) – 3:39

 UK cassette single and European CD single 
 "Summer Son" – 4:04
 "Summer Son" (Giorgio Moroder radio mix) – 3:39

 Australian CD single 
 "Summer Son"
 "Don't You Want Me" (live at Glastonbury '99)
 "Summer Son" (Giorgio Moroder alternative 12-inch)
 "Summer Son" (Love to Infinity Sunburn mix)
 "Summer Son" (Tee's Freeze mix)
 "Say What You Want" (live at 2Day FM in Sydney, 28 May 1997)

Credits and personnel
Credits are lifted from The Hush album booklet.

Studios
 Recorded at Shar's house and Park Lane (Glasgow, Scotland)
 Mixed at the Mix Suite, Olympic Studios (London, England)

Personnel

 Texas – all instruments, programming
 Johnny McElhone – writing, production (as Johnny Mac)
 Sharleen Spiteri – writing
 Eddie Campbell – writing
 Ally McErlaine
 Robert Hodgens – writing
 Tony McGovern – guitars
 Paul Smith – guitars
 Richard Hynd – drums, additional programming
 Mark "Spike" Stent – mixing

Charts and certifications

Weekly charts

Year-end charts

Certifications

Release history

References

1999 singles
1999 songs
Mercury Records singles
Music videos directed by Stéphane Sednaoui
Songs written by Johnny McElhone
Songs written by Sharleen Spiteri
Texas (band) songs